Dewart is a census-designated place located in Delaware Township, Northumberland County in the state of Pennsylvania.  The community is located very close to the West Branch Susquehanna River along Pennsylvania Route 405 in far northern Northumberland County.  As of the 2010 census the population was 1,471 residents.

Demographics

References

Census-designated places in Northumberland County, Pennsylvania
Census-designated places in Pennsylvania